Vietnamocasia is a genus of flowering plants belonging to the family Araceae.

Its native range is Vietnam.

Species:
 Vietnamocasia dauae N.S.Lý, Haev., S.Y.Wong & V.D.Nguyen

References

Araceae
Araceae genera